Södertörns Simsällskap is a Swedish swim team founded in 1967. The club's activities take place in Eriksdalsbadet, Torvalla simhall and Vårbyhallen. The most famous swimmer is Sarah Sjöström.

Swimmers
Stefan Nystrand (-2006)
Louise Jöhncke
Simon Sjödin
Sarah Sjöström

External links
Södertörns SS's official homepage 

Swimming clubs in Sweden
Sports clubs established in 1967
Sporting clubs in Stockholm
1967 establishments in Sweden